Breviatea are a group of free-living, amitochondriate parasitic protists with uncertain phylogenetic position. They are biflagellate, and can live in anaerobic (oxygen-free) environments. They are currently placed in the proposed Obazoa clade. They likely do not possess vinculin proteins. Their metabolism relies fermentative production of ATP as an adaptation to their low-oxygen environment.

The lineage emerged roughly one billion years ago, at a time when the oxygen content of the Earth's oceans were low, and they thus developed anaerobic lifestyles. Together with Apusomonads, they are the closest relatives of the Opisthokonts, a group that includes animals and fungi.

Species

Family Breviatidae 
Breviata

 Breviata anathema

Lenisia

 Lenisia limosa

Pygsuia

 Pygsuia biforma

Subulatomonas

 Subulatomonas tetraspora

References 

Obazoa